Frederick William Holmes (9 August 1886 – 9 November 1944) was a British tug of war competitor who competed in the 1920 Summer Olympics. In 1920 he won the gold medal as member of the British team, which was entirely composed of City of London Police officers.

References

External links
profile

1886 births
1944 deaths
Olympic tug of war competitors of Great Britain
Tug of war competitors at the 1920 Summer Olympics
Olympic gold medallists for Great Britain
Olympic medalists in tug of war
Medalists at the 1920 Summer Olympics
City of London Police officers
20th-century British people